Peter Rice (born 1966) is a British businessman and the former Chairman of Disney General Entertainment Content for The Walt Disney Company.

Early life
Rice was born in the United Kingdom in 1966 and raised in Britain. He earned a degree from the University of Nottingham in 1989.

Career

Head of Disney Television
Rice most recently joined The Walt Disney Company following its purchase of many of 21st Century Fox’s assets. Upon joining, Rice became the Chairman of Walt Disney Television (all of Disney's non-sports television business), succeeding Ben Sherwood.

On June 9, 2022, Rice was fired by The Walt Disney Company and replaced by Dana Walden.

21st Century Fox

Fox Television
Rice was appointed President of 21st Century Fox in 2017. In addition to working on strategic initiatives at 21st Century Fox, Rice continues to serve as Chairman and CEO of Fox Networks Group. He is also the Chairman of the Board of National Geographic Partners and a member of the Board of Directors for Hulu.

Rice became Chairman and CEO of Fox Networks Group in 2012, supervising Fox Broadcasting Company, 20th Century Fox Television, FX Networks, Fox Sports (encompassing Fox’s national sports channels, FS1 and FS2 and its 22 regional sports networks) and National Geographic Partners (which includes the National Geographic channels and brands).

In 2016, Fox Networks Group received 144 Primetime and Sports Emmy nominations. Fox Sports won 10 Sports Emmy Awards, the most of any network group and FS1 earned eight awards, the most of any network. Fox received 103 Primetime Emmy nominations spanning FX, Fox, National Geographic Channel and shows from 20th Century Fox Television and Fox 21 Television Studios, and won 27 Primetime Emmy Awards. FX earned 56 nominations, setting a new record for nominations by a basic cable network, surpassing its own previous record of 45 set in 2014.  The People v. O.J. Simpson earned 22 nominations and Fargo received 18, the second and third highest total number of nominations of any show that year. In 2017, under Rice’s leadership, Fox Networks Group received 153 Primetime and Sports Emmy nominations, and won a collective 26 Emmys.

Before assuming his current role, Rice served as Chairman of Entertainment of Fox Networks Group. During that time, Rice helped propel Fox to three seasons as the number one network, extending its run on top to eight consecutive years.  Earlier, Rice served as Chairman of Entertainment of Fox Broadcasting Company. He replaced Peter Liguori and reported to then Fox Networks Group Chairman Tony Vinciquerra.

Fox Filmed Entertainment
Prior to his roles in Fox's television business, Rice was President for Fox Searchlight Pictures. He began his tenure there in 2000, during which time he released some of the most critically acclaimed films of the decade and some of the highest-grossing films in Fox Searchlight’s history, including Juno, The Last King of Scotland, Bend It Like Beckham, Little Miss Sunshine, Sideways and Napoleon Dynamite.  With Rice at the helm, Fox Searchlight received 51 Academy Award and 42 Golden Globe Award nominations, including a record of 12 nominations and eight wins for Slumdog Millionaire at the 81st Academy Awards.

From 2007 to 2008, Rice also oversaw Fox Atomic, which created comedy and genre films, including Turistas and 28 Weeks Later. Fox Atomic was closed in 2009.

Rice began his career at Twentieth Century Fox in 1989, working for Tom Sherak, then head of U.S. distribution and marketing for Fox Filmed Entertainment. His roles included Director of Acquisitions, Vice President of Production and Senior Vice President, and in 1998, Rice was named Executive Vice President of Production for Twentieth Century Fox.

Rice cultivated relationships with some of the most talented young filmmakers of the time, including Danny Boyle, Bryan Singer, Baz Luhrmann, Alex Proyas and the Hughes brothers. Rice worked as a creative executive on Boyle's A Life Less Ordinary and oversaw the director's The Beach. Rice worked with Luhrmann in the development and production of his films, Moulin Rouge! (which would be nominated for the Academy Award for Best Picture and Romeo + Juliet. Rice was the supervising creative executive on  X-Men, which started a successful movie franchise that would go on to gross more than $4.3 billion at the global box office.  He also worked on blockbuster films Independence Day and Alien Resurrection.

Personal life
Rice lives in Los Angeles with his family. He serves on the board of directors of the National Cable & Telecommunications Association, Southern California Public Radio and the Walter Kaitz Foundation. Rice also sits on the Motion Picture & Television Fund’s Board of Governors.

References

1966 births
Living people
British television executives
Disney executives
American Broadcasting Company executives
Presidents of the American Broadcasting Company